Hazel Buck (born 8 March 1932 in Wyong, New South Wales, Australia) is an Australian former cricket player.

Buck played three tests for the Australia national women's cricket team.

References

1932 births
Australia women Test cricketers
Living people
People from New South Wales